Dieburg is a small town in southern Hesse, Germany. It was formerly the seat of the district ("Kreis") of Dieburg, but is now part of the district of Darmstadt-Dieburg.

History
The town of Dieburg was first named in 1492 in the tax books of the archbishopric of Hessen-Nassau. The city's name is derived from the Middle High German words diot, meaning "people," and burg, meaning "castle." Dieburg therefore refers to the castle of the people, located in the center of the medieval town. The town's centre largely consists of historical timber-framed houses from medieval times. The Dieburg Museum, located in the Fechenbach stately home, displays archeological findings. Of special interest is a Roman temple relief of Mithras and a dyer's workshop. The coat of arms of the town Dieburg shows Martin of Tours. A cultural highlight is the yearly carnival, including a carnival parade that is completely based on honorary posts.

Geography
Dieburg is situated north of mountain range Odenwald in southern Hesse. The Gersprenz (47 km), tributary to the Main, flows through Dieburg. The city of Darmstadt is located 15 kilometres to the West, the city of Frankfurt on the Main is located around 40 kilometres to the North of Dieburg.

Mayors
 1976–1982:  Stephan Schmitt (CDU)
 1983–1987:  Helmut Aelken (CDU)
 1987–2005:  Peter Christ (CDU)
 2005–2017:  Werner Thomas, Sc.D. (first independent, since 2015 CDU), Thomas was reelected in March 2011 with 70,7 % of the votes.
 since 2017: Frank Haus (independent)

Twin towns – sister cities

Dieburg is twinned with:
 Aubergenville, France (1975)
 Reinsdorf, Germany (1990)
 Mladá Boleslav, Czech Republic (1997)

Notable people
Klaus Schrodt (born 1946), aerobatics pilot, various titles as German, European and World Champion
Bertram Schmitt (born 1958), professor of law, Judge of the Federal Court of Justice and the International Criminal Court
Willy A. Flegel (born 1960), professor of transfusion medicine and Immunohematology
Jörg Roßkopf (born 1969), table tennis player, grew up in Münster (near Dieburg) 
Marvin Schwäbe (born 1995), footballer

Seal of Dieburg

References

Darmstadt-Dieburg
Grand Duchy of Hesse